French-Georgian relations are foreign relations between France and Georgia. Diplomatic relations between both countries were established on August 21, 1992. Both nations are members of the Council of Europe.

Resident diplomatic mission
 France has an embassy in Tbilisi.
 Georgia has an embassy in Paris.

See also 
 Foreign relations of France 
 Foreign relations of Georgia
 Georgian-French day of Leuville-sur-Orge
 Georgians in France
 Georgians in Europe 
 French people in Georgia
 Georgia–EU relations

External links
French Ministry of Foreign affairs about the relations with Georgia 
French embassy in Tbilissi (in French and Georgian only)
Georgian Ministry of Foreign Affairs about the relations with France

Georgia
Bilateral relations of Georgia (country)
France–Georgia (country) relations